Sadaaki (written: , , ,  or ) is a masculine Japanese given name. Notable people with the name include:

, Japanese World War II flying ace
, Japanese regent
Sadaaki Konishi (1916–1949), Imperial Japanese Army officer
, Japanese daimyō
, Japanese politician
, Japanese baseball player

Japanese masculine given names